The empty weight of a vehicle is based on its weight without any payload (cargo, passengers, usable fuel, etc.).

Aviation 
Many different empty weight definitions exist. Here are some of the more common ones used.

GAMA standardization 

In 1975 (or 1976 per FAA-H-8083-1B)  the General Aviation Manufacturers Association (GAMA) standardized the definition of empty weight terms for Pilot Operating Handbooks as follows:

Standard Empty Weight includes the following:
 Empty weight of the airplane
 Full Hydraulic Fluid
 Unusable Fuel
 Full Oil

Optional Equipment includes the following:
 All equipment installed beyond standard

Non-GAMA usage 

Previously (Regarding aircraft certified under CAR Part 3) the following were commonly used to define empty weights:

In this definition Empty Weight includes the following:
 Empty weight of the airplane
 Undrainable Oil
 Full Hydraulic Fluid

Note that weight of oil must be added to Licensed Empty Weight for it to be equivalent to Basic Empty Weight

Ground transportation 

In the United States, bridge weight limits for trucks and other heavy vehicles may be expressed in terms of gross vehicle weight or empty weight.

See also 
 Zero Fuel Weight
 Maximum Takeoff Weight

References

Aircraft weight measurements
Vehicle law
Trucks